Eagle Farm Racecourse is a heritage-listed horse racing venue in Brisbane, Queensland, Australia. It is located at the northern end of Racecourse Road in the suburb of Ascot,  from the Brisbane central business district.

Races are run in a clockwise direction.

Doomben Racecourse is located nearby in the same suburb.

History
The Eagle Farm Racecourse was established in 1863 and it is now the premier racecourse in Brisbane.

In 1889–1890, the architecture partnership Hunter and Corrie and architect John H. Buckeridge jointly designed the grandstands, known as the Paddock Stands. They also designed stables and sheds.

In 1941 the racecourse was taken over by the military authorities to house thousands of American troops during the Pacific War. It was then known as U.S. Camp Ascot.

Heritage listing
A combined entry Eagle Farm Racecourse and Ascot Railway Station was listed on the Queensland Heritage Register in 2004.

Transport
Ascot railway station has direct access to the racecourse and is located on the Doomben line. The racecourse can also be accessed by bus and, from Bretts Wharf, by CityCat.

Races
The following is a list of Group races which are run at Eagle Farm Racecourse:

References

External links

Brisbane Racing Club

Horse racing venues in Australia
Sports venues in Brisbane
1863 establishments in Australia
Queensland Heritage Register
John H. Buckeridge buildings
Leslie Corrie buildings
Henry Hunter buildings
Sports venues completed in 1863
Ascot, Queensland